The Jonas Brothers are an American  pop rock band from Wyckoff, New Jersey. They are currently signed with Republic Records. They have released five albums to date, It's About Time, Jonas Brothers, A Little Bit Longer, Lines, Vines, and Trying Times, and Happiness Begins.

American Music Awards

The American Music Awards is an annual awards ceremony created by Dick Clark in 1973 and one of several annual major American music awards shows (among the others are the Grammy Awards, the MTV Video Music Awards etc.). Jonas Brothers have received five nominations and won twice.

|-
| 2008 || rowspan="2"| Themselves || T-Mobile Breakthrough Artist || 
|-
| rowspan="2"| 2019 || Favorite Duo or Group – Pop/Rock || 
|-
| "Sucker" || Favorite Song – Pop/Rock  || 
|-
| rowspan="2"| 2020 || rowspan="2"| Themselves || Favorite Duo or Group - Pop/Rock || 
|-
| Favorite Artist - Adult Contemporary || 
|-

ASCAP Pop Music Awards
Organized by the American Society of Composers, Authors and Publishers (ASCAP), the ASCAP Music Awards program honors the most-performed and outstanding songs written and their writers. 
 
|-
| 2020 || “Sucker” || Song of the Year ||

Billboard

Billboard Music Awards
The Billboard Music Awards is an honor given out annually by Billboard, a publication and music popularity chart covering the music business.

!
|-
| rowspan="4"| 2020
| rowspan="3"| Themselves
| Top Artist
|  || 
|-
| Top Duo/Group
|  || 
|-
| Top Radio Songs Artist
|  || 
|-
|"Sucker"
|Top Radio Song 
| || 
|-
|}

Billboard Touring Music Awards
The Billboard Touring Award is an annual award hosted by Billboard. The Jonas Brothers have received two nominations, which they have won.

|-
| 2008 || Jonas Brothers and Burger King || Concert Marketing and Promotion || 
|-
| 2009 || Jonas Brothers World Tour 2009 || Eventful Fans' Choice Award ||

BMI Pop Awards
The BMI Pop Awards are presented annually by Broadcast Music, Inc., honoring the songwriters, composers, and music publishers of the biggest pop songs of the year.   

|-
| rowspan="2"| 2020 || “Cool” || rowspan="4| Most Performed Song of the Year || 
|-
| “Sucker” || 
|-
| rowspan="2"| 2021 || “Only Human” || 
|-
| “What a Man Gotta Do” ||

Clio Awards
The Clio Awards is an annual award program that recognizes innovation and creative excellence in advertising, design, and communication, as judged by an international panel of advertising professionals. 

|-
| 2020 || “What a Man Gotta Do” || Bronze Winner ||

Global Awards

The Global Awards are held by Global and reward music played on British radio stations including Capital, Capital XTRA, Heart, Classic FM, Smooth, Radio X, LBC and Gold, with the awards categories reflecting the songs, artists, programmes and news aired on each station. Jonas Brothers have received one nomination.

|-

| 2020 || Themselves || Best Group || 

|-

| 2021 || Themselves || Best Group ||

Golden Raspberry Awards

The Golden Raspberry Awards are awarded annually and are held concurrently to the Academy Awards.  The "Razzies," as they are informally called, honour the year's worst in film.  The Jonas Brothers have been nominated for two awards and won one.

|-
| rowspan="2"| 2009 || Themselves (Jonas Brothers: The 3D Concert Experience) || Worst Actor || 
|-
| Any two (or more) Jonas Brothers (Jonas Brothers: The 3D Concert Experience) || Worst Screen Couple ||

Grammy Awards
The Grammy Awards are awarded annually by the National Academy of Recording Arts and Sciences of the United States. The Jonas Brothers have received two nominations.

!
|-
| 2009 || Themselves || Best New Artist ||  ||
|-
| 2020 || "Sucker" || Best Pop Duo/Group Performance ||  ||

Guinness World Records
Guinness Worlds Records, formally known as Guinness Book of World Records, is a reference book published annually, listing world records both of human achievements and the extremes of the natural world. 

|-
| 2008 || Themselves || Most entries in the US top 20 in a year by a group ||

Hollywood Walk of Fame
The Hollywood Walk of Fame is a historic landmark which consists of more than 2,700  stars embedded in the sidewalks of Hollywood Boulevard in Hollywood, California. The stars are permanent public monuments to outstanding achievement in the entertainment industry. The Jonas Brothers are a part of the Class of 2023 inductees. 

|-
| 2023 || Jonas Brothers || Hollywood Walk of Fame Star ||

iHeartRadio Music Awards
The iHeartRadio Music Awards is an international music awards show founded by iHeartRadio in 2014. The Jonas Brothers has been received four nominations, winning one award.

!
|-
| rowspan="3"| 2020
| rowspan="2"| "Sucker"
| Song of the Year
| 
| rowspan="3"|
|-
| Best Music Video
| 
|-
| rowspan="2"| Themselves
| rowspan="2"| Best Duo/Group of the Year 
| 
|-
| 2021
| 
| 
|-
|}

iHeartRadio Titanium Awards 
iHeartRadio Titanium Awards are awarded to an artist when their song reaches 1 Billion Spins across iHeartRadio Stations.

LOS40 Music Awards
The LOS40 Music Awards is an annual awards established in 2006 by the Spanish music radio Los 40 Principales.

!
|-
| rowspan="4"| 2019
| Themselves
| Best International Artist
| 
| style="text-align:center;" rowspan="4"|
|-
| Happiness Begins
| Best International Album
| 
|-
| rowspan="2"| "Sucker"
| Best International Song
| 
|-
| Best International Video
| 
|-
|}

MTV

Los Premios MTV Latinoamérica
Los Premios MTV Latinoamérica is the Latin American version of the MTV Video Music Awards. The Jonas Brothers have received nine nominations, winning five. Joe Jonas and Nick Jonas, both received an individual award for the Best Fashionista (Most Fashionable) in 2008 and 2009 respectively.

|-
|rowspan="6"| 2008 || rowspan="3"| Themselves || Mejor Artista Pop Internacional (Best International Pop Artist)|| 
|-
| Mejor Artista Nuevo Internacional (Best International New Artist) || 
|-
| Mejor Fanclub (Best Fanclub) || 
|-
| rowspan="2"|"When You Look Me in the Eyes" || Canción del Año (Song of the Year) || 
|-
| Mejor Ringtone (Best Ringtone)  || 
|-
| Joe Jonas || rowspan=2 | Best Fashionista (Most Fashionable)|| 
|-
|rowspan="3"| 2009 || Nick Jonas||
|-
|rowspan="2"| Themselves || Mejor Fanclub (Best Fanclub) ||
|-
| Mejor Artista Pop Internacional (Best International Pop Artist)||
|-

MTV Europe Music Awards
The MTV Europe Music Awards is an annual awards ceremony established in 1994 by MTV Europe. The Jonas Brothers have received five nominations.

|-
| 2008 || rowspan="5”| Themselves || New Act || 
|-
| 2009 || rowspan="2"| Best Group || 
|-
| rowspan="2"|2019 || 
|-
| Best Pop || 
|-
| 2021 || Best Group ||

MTV Millennial Awards 
The MTV Millennial Awards (commonly abbreviated as a MIAW) is an annual program of Latin American music awards, presented by the cable channel MTV Latin America to honor the best of Latin music and the digital world of the millennial generation.

!
|-
| 2019
| "Sucker"
| Global Hit
|  
| style="text-align:center;" rowspan="1"|
|-
|}

MTV Millennial Awards Brazil
The MTV Millennial Awards Brazil were held the first time in 2018. The awards are the Brazilian version of the Latin MTV Millennial Awards.

!
|-
| rowspan="2"| 2019
| "Sucker"
| Global Hit
| 
| style="text-align:center;" rowspan="2"| 
|-
| Themselves
| Came back with everything! 
| 
|-
|}

MTV Video Music Awards
The MTV Video Music Awards is an annual awards ceremony established in 1984 by MTV. The Jonas brothers have received ten nominations.

|-
|rowspan="2"|  || rowspan="2"|"Burnin' Up" || Best Pop Video || 
|-
| rowspan="2"| Video of the Year || 
|-
| rowspan="6"| 2019 || rowspan="4"| "Sucker" || 
|-
| Song of the Year || 
|-
| Best Pop || 
|-
| Song of Summer || 
|-
| rowspan="2"| Themselves || Artist of the Year || 
|-
| Best Group || 
|-
| 2020 || "What a Man Gotta Do" || Best Pop || 
|-
| 2021 || Themselves || Group of the Year ||

MuchMusic Video Awards
The MuchMusic Video Awards is an annual awards ceremony presented by the Canadian music video channel MuchMusic. The Jonas Brothers have received three nominations, winning two.

|-
|rowspan="2"| 2009 || "Lovebug" || International Video of the Year - Group || 
|-
| "Burnin' Up" || UR Fave: International Video - Group || 
|-
| 2010 || "Paranoid" || rowspan=2 | International Video of the Year - Group || 
|-
| 2013 || "Pom Poms" || 
|}

MYX Music Awards
The Myx Music Awards are accolades presented by the cable channel Myx to honor the biggest hits and hit makers in the Philippines. The Jonas Brothers have received two nominations.  

|-
| 2009 || "When You Look Me in the Eyes" || International Video of the Year || 
|-
| 2020 || "Sucker" || International Video of the Year ||

Nickelodeon Choice Awards

Nickelodeon Australian Kids' Choice Awards
The Nickelodeon Australian Kids' Choice Awards honor entertainers with a blimp trophy, as voted by children.

!
|-
| 2008
| rowspan="2"| Themselves
| Fave Band
| 
| style="text-align:center;" rowspan="1"|
|-
|rowspan="2"|2009
| Favorite International Band
| 
| style="text-align:center;" rowspan="2"|
|-
| "Paranoid"
| Song of the Year
| 
|-

Nickelodeon Italian Kids' Choice Awards
The Nickelodeon Italy Kids' Choice Awards is an annual awards show that awards entertainers with a blimp trophy.

!
|-
|rowspan="2"|2008
|Themselves
|Best Band 
|
| style="text-align:center;" rowspan="2"|
|-
|"S.O.S"
| Most Addictive Track
|

Nickelodeon Mexican Kids' Choice Awards
The Nickelodeon Mexico Kids' Choice Awards is an annual awards show that awards entertainers with a blimp trophy.

!
|-
|rowspan="2"|2019
| Themselves
| Favorite International Artist or Group
|
| style="text-align:center;" rowspan="2"|
|-
| "Sucker"
| Favorite Hit
|

Nickelodeon Kids' Choice Awards
The Nickelodeon Kids' Choice Awards is an annual awards show established in 1988 by Nickelodeon. The Jonas Brothers have received 13 nominations and have won 2 awards.

|-
| 2008 || rowspan="2"| Themselves || rowspan="2"| Favorite Music Group || 
|-
| 2009 || 
|-
|rowspan="3"| 2010 || Joe Jonas || rowspan="2"| Favorite TV Actor || 
|-
| Nick Jonas|| 
|-
| Themselves|| Favorite Music Group || 
|-
|rowspan="3"| 2011 || Joe Jonas|| rowspan="2"| Favorite TV Actor || 
|-
| Nick Jonas|| 
|-
| Themselves|| Favorite Music Group || 
|-
|rowspan="2"| 2020 || Themselves || Favorite Music Group || 
|-
| Sucker|| Favorite Song || 
|-
| 2021 || Themselves || Favorite Music Group || 
|-
| 2022 || Themselves || Favorite Music Group || 
|-
| 2022 || Leave Before You Love Me by Marshmello x Jonas Brothers || Favorite Music Collaboration ||

NME Awards

The NME Awards is an annual music awards show, founded by the music magazine, NME (New Musical Express). The first awards show was held in 1953, shortly after the founding of the magazine. The Jonas Brothers have received five awards over three years, receiving the "Worst Band" award for three years in a row.

|-
| rowspan=2 | 2009 || A Little Bit Longer|| Worst Album || 
|-
| Themselves || Worst Band || 
|-
| rowspan=2 | 2010 || Lines, Vines and Trying Times|| Worst Album || 
|-
| Themselves || rowspan=2 | Worst Band || 
|-
| rowspan=1 | 2011 || Themselves ||

NRJ Music Awards
An NRJ Music Award (commonly abbreviated as an NMA) is an award presented by the French radio station NRJ to honor the best in the French and worldwide music industry. The Jonas Brothers have received 4 nominations and have won 2 awards.

|- 
| 2009 || Themselves || International Breakthrough of the Year || 
|-
| 2019 || Themselves || International Duo/Group of the Year || 
|-
| 2019 || Video of the Year || "Sucker" || 
|-
| 2019 || Themselves || Award of Merit ||

Planeta Awards
The Planeta awards are hosted in Lima (Peru) from the radio TV station 107.7 fm. The Jonas Brothers have received 5 nominations and have won all 5 awards.

|-
| rowspan=2 | 2008 || Themselves || Best new artist international|| 
|-
| Song of the year || "Lovebug"|| 
|-
| rowspan=2 | 2009 || Balada del año ||"Paranoid" || 
|-
| rowspan=2 | Themselves || Best Fan club|| 
|-
| 2010 || Best Artist (Banda del año)||

People's Choice Awards
The People's Choice Awards are awards show recognizing the best in entertainment & pop culture, voted online by the general public and fans. The Jonas Brothers have received 5 nominations.

|-
| 2019 || Happiness Begins || Favorite Album || 
|-
| 2019 || Sucker || Favorite Song || 
|-
| 2019 || Themselves || Favorite Group || 
|-
| 2020 || Themselves || Favorite Group || 
|-
| 2021 || Themselves || Favorite Group ||

Pollstar Awards
The Pollstar Awards are awarded by the trade publication Pollstar to artists, management, talent buyers, venues, and support services for professionalism and achievements in the concert tour industry.  

|-
| 2009 || Themselves || Best New Touring Artist || 
|-
| 2020 || Happiness Begins Tour || Pop Tour of the Year || 
|-
| 2022 || Remember This Tour || Pop Tour of the Year ||

Premios Juventud
The Premios Juventud is an awards show for Spanish-speaking celebrities in the areas of film, music, sports, fashion and pop culture, presented by Univision. The Jonas Brothers have received one nomination. 
 
|-
| 2021 || “X” featuring Karol G|| Colaboración OMG ||

Premio Lo Nuestro
The Premio Lo Nuestro or Lo Nuestro Awards are Spanish-language awards show honoring the best Latin music of the year. The Jonas Brothers have received one nomination. 
 
|-
| 2020 || “Runaway” || Colaboración del Año ||

Premios Oye!
Los Premios Oye! are presented annually by the "National Academy of Music in Mexico" to reward the best artists of the music industry. Los Premios Oye! are equivalent to the Grammy Awards in the United States. The Jonas Brothers received one nomination which they have won.

|-
|2008 || Themselves || Main English artists of the year || 
|-

Spotify Plaques
The Spotify Plaques are awarded to artists to recognize songs that exceed 1 billion streams on the platform.

|-
| 2021 || “Sucker” || 1,000,000,000 streams ||

Teen Choice Awards
The Teen Choice Awards is an annual awards show established in 1999 by the Fox Broadcasting Company. The Jonas Brothers have received 24 nominations, winning 17.

|-
|rowspan="7"| 2008 ||rowspan="3"| Themselves || Choice Music Breakout Group || 
|-
| Choice Male Red Carpet Icon[s] || 
|-
| Choice Male Hottie[s] || 
|-
|rowspan="2"| "When You Look Me in the Eyes" || Choice Music Single || 
|-
| Choice Music Love Song || 
|-
| "Burnin' Up" || Choice Summer Song || 
|-
|rowspan="2"| Themselves || Most Fanatic Fans || 
|-
|rowspan="9"| 2009 ||Choice TV Actor Comedy || 
|-
| Jonas || Choice Breakout Show || 
|-
| "Lovebug" || Choice Music Love Song || 
|-
|Lines, Vines and Trying Times ||Choice Music Album Group || 
|-
|rowspan="3"| Themselves || Choice Music Tour || 
|-
| Choice Male Hottie || 
|-
| Choice Red Carpet Fashion Icon Male || 
|-
|"Before The Storm" || Choice Summer Song || 
|-
|Frankie Jonas || Choice TV Breakout Male || 
|-
|rowspan="2"| 2010 ||rowspan="3"| Themselves || Choice TV Actor Comedy || 
|-
| Red Carpet Fashion Icon Male || 
|-
|rowspan="6"| 2019 || Choice Music Group || 
|-
| "Sucker" || Choice Song: Group || 
|-
| "Sucker" || Choice Pop Song || 
|-
| "Cool" || Choice Summer Song || 
|-
|rowspan="2"| Themselves || Choice Summer Group || 
|-
| Decade Award ||

Telehit Awards

|-
|rowspan="3"| 2019 ||rowspan="3"| "Sucker" || Best Anglo Video || 
|-
| Best Anglo Song || 
|-
| People's Best Video || 
|}

The Soup Awards
The Soup is a TV show hosted by comedian Joel McHale. Joe Jonas has received one nomination and won.

|-
| 2010 || Joe Jonas ||  Best Third Jonas || 
|-

TMF Awards
The TMF Awards is an annual television awards show established in 1995 by The Music Factory. The Jonas Brothers have received eight nominations, winning four.

|-
|rowspan="5"| 2008 ||rowspan="2"| Themselves || Best New Artist || 
|-
| Best Pop || 
|-
| Jonas Brothers || Best New Album || 
|-
| Jonas Brothers || Best International Album || 
|-
| "S.O.S" || rowspan=2 | Best Video || 
|-
|rowspan="3"| 2009 || Paranoid || 
|-
| Lines, Vines and Trying Times || Best International Album || 
|-
|  Themselves || Best Pop ||

Variety Power of Youth Awards
The Variety Power of Youth awards were awarded annually by the entertainment publication Variety to honor celebrities who through their efforts have made significant contributions to their chosen philanthropic and charitable causes.
 

|-
| 2012 || Themselves || Power of Youth Philanthropy Award ||

Vh1 "Do Something!" Awards

The Vh1 "Do Something" awards are hosted every year to award athletes, music artists and actors that have portrayed a social issue during the year 2010. The Jonas Brothers have received one nomination which they have won.

|-
| align="center"|2010 || Themselves ||Best Music Artist||

Festival de Viña del mar-Chile
The Viña del mar's Festival, is a well-known festival in Chile, in which, the people (called monster) calls the awards and give it to the artists.[15]

|-
|rowspan="4"| 2013 ||rowspan="4"| Themselves || Antorcha de plata || 
|-
| Antorcha de oro || 
|-
|Gaviota de plata || 
|-
| Gaviota de oro ||

References

Awards
Lists of awards received by American musician
Lists of awards received by musical group